The Canal Saint-Martin is a 4.6 km (2.86 mi) long canal in Paris, connecting the Canal de l'Ourcq to the river Seine. Over nearly half its length, between the Rue du Faubourg du Temple and the Place de la Bastille, it was covered, in the mid-19th century, to create wide boulevards and public spaces on the surface. The canal is drained and cleaned every 10–15 years, and it is always a source of fascination for Parisians to discover curiosities and even some treasures among the hundreds of tons of discarded objects.

History

Gaspard de Chabrol, prefect of Paris, proposed building a canal from the river Ourcq, 100 km northeast of Paris, to supply the city with fresh water to support a growing population and help avoid diseases such as dysentery and cholera, while also supplying fountains and allowing the streets to be cleaned. Construction of the canal was ordered by Napoleon I in 1802 and construction took place until 1825, funded by a new tax on wine. 

The canal was also used to supply Paris with grain, building materials and other goods, carried on canal boats. Two ports were created on the canal in Paris to unload the boats: Port de l'Arsenal and the Bassin de la Villette.

By the 1960s, traffic had dwindled to a trickle and the canal narrowly escaped being filled in and paved over for a highway.

Route
The entrance to the canal from the vast terminal basin (Bassin de la Villette) of the Canal de l'Ourcq is at a double lock near the Place de Stalingrad. Continuing towards the river Seine, the canal is bordered by the Quai de Valmy on the right bank and the Quai de Jemmapes on the left, passing through three more double staircase locks before disappearing under the three successive voûtes (tunnels) – du Temple, Richard-Lenoir and Bastille – to emerge in the Port de l'Arsenal, the principal port for boats visiting and residing in Paris.

Tourism
Today, the canal is a popular destination for Parisians and tourists. Some take cruises on the canal in passenger boats. Others watch the barges and other boats navigate the series of locks and pass under the attractive cast-iron footbridges. There are many popular restaurants and bars along the open part of the canal, which is also popular with students.

Métro stations
The canal can be accessed from the following Paris Métro stations: Stalingrad, République, Goncourt,  (Paris Métro) Jacques Bonsergent, Jaurès.

In popular culture
Art

The canal inspired painters such as Alfred Sisley (1839-1899). In the present day, many intricate works of graffiti are visible along the canal, and there is a large multimedia art space on its banks at the former municipal undertakers building at 104 rue d'Aubervilliers ('104').

Film and television
 The canal was the setting in part for Jean Vigo's film L'Atalante in 1934.
 The canal is shown in the 1938 film Hôtel du Nord, directed by Marcel Carné.
In Les Malheurs d'Alfred (1972), Pierre Richard and Anny Duperey meet each other at the beginning of the film, thinking of committing suicide in the canal.
The French police series PJ (:fr:PJ (série télévisée)) uses an external shot of a building at 52 rue Bichat, located next to the canal, as the frontage of the police station. Cars were often shown exiting the building and the canal and  adjacent neighbourhood were used as backdrops for scenes.
 The canal appears in Jean-Pierre Jeunet's famous 2001 film known in English as Amélie, in which the title character is shown enjoying one of her favourite activities: skipping stones at the locks of the canal.
 The canal was used as an escape route for Ethan Hunt and his team in the 2018 film Mission: Impossible – Fallout.

Music
Édith Piaf sings about the canal in the song "Les mômes de la cloche", written by Vincent Scotto and Decaye, music by Médinger, in 1936.
Courteeners song "The Dilettante" mentions the canal and talks of the pleasant atmosphere surrounding it.

Literature
Georges Simenon's novel Maigret and the Headless Corpse (Maigret et le corps sans tête) is set in and around the canal.

Gallery

References

External links

Paris - Canal de l'Ourcq, Canal Saint-Denis and Canal Saint-Martin maps and information on places, ports and moorings on the canals, by the author of Inland Waterways of France, Imray
Navigation details for 80 French rivers and canals (French waterways website section)
Blog of the Canal Saint-Martin quarter 
Canal Saint-Martin map 
The sunken treasures of a Paris canal

Geography of Paris
Transport in Paris
Place de la Bastille
Saint-Martin
10th arrondissement of Paris
Canals opened in 1825